The Honda NSR50 is one of the most commonly raced motorcycles in minibike club road racing. Though the NSR50 is not street legal in the United States, safe and legal racing environments are available in many states, often found at kart racing tracks.

The NSR50 has a 49cc water-cooled, two-stroke engine, and a manual clutch with six gears. It typically falls into class with other two-stroke 50cc road bikes such as the Yamaha YSR50, but is also commonly classed with up to 110cc four-stroke bikes.

Parts

The front sprocket of the NSR50 is identical to that of the more common Honda XR50 dirt bike.

The NSR50R was produced in 2004, and Honda dealers still carry replacement parts for them.

See also
Sport moped

External links
 Honda Racing Corporation

NSR50
Minibikes
Motorcycles introduced in 2004
Two-stroke motorcycles